Viviano Minardi (born 15 June 1998) is an Italian footballer who plays as a midfielder.

Club career
He made his Serie C debut for Cosenza on 7 October 2015 in a game against Catania.

On 25 September 2020 he joined Serie D club Prato.

On 16 August 2021, he returned to Pistoiese on a one-year deal.

References

External links
 

1998 births
Living people
Sportspeople from Cosenza
Footballers from Calabria
Italian footballers
Association football midfielders
Serie C players
Serie D players
Genoa C.F.C. players
Cosenza Calcio players
U.S. Pistoiese 1921 players
A.C. Prato players